Pavlo Kachur (b. 8 December 1953, Sosulivka, Chortkiv Raion) is a Ukrainian politician.

Education 
In 1980, he graduated from Lviv State University, Faculty of Applied Mathematics and Mechanics, mechanic.

In 1994, he graduated from the Institute of Public Administration and Self-Government under the Cabinet of Ministers of Ukraine, Master of Public Administration.

Candidate of Physical and Mathematical Sciences.

April 1990 — August 1993 — Deputy Chairman of the Lviv City Council of People's Deputies. Member of the Movement, member of the Lithuanian Support Committee.

September 1994 — May 1996 — First Deputy Chairman of the City Executive Committee, Director of the Department of the Lviv City Council of People's Deputies.

June 1996 — March 1999 — Deputy Executive Director of the Association of Ukrainian Cities, Kyiv.

March 1999 — March 2000 — Deputy Executive Director — Head of the Center for Cooperation of Cities of the Association of Ukrainian Cities, Kyiv.

March 9, 2000 — May 30, 2001 — Adviser to the Prime Minister of Ukraine Viktor Yushchenko.

September 2001 — April 2002 — Vice-President of the All-Ukrainian Union of Public Organizations "Association of Regional Development Agencies of Ukraine", Kyiv.

June 11, 2002 — October 6, 2005 — People's Deputy of Ukraine of the 4th convocation from the Victor Yushchenko Bloc "Our Ukraine", district 117, Lviv region. Member of the Committee on Budget. Terminated prematurely on October 6, 2005.

September 28, 2005 — August 4, 2006 — Minister of Construction, Architecture and Housing and Communal Services of Ukraine in the government of Yuriy Yekhanurov in 2005—2006.

October 30, 2006 — December 26, 2006 — Adviser to the President of Ukraine.

December 26, 2006 — April 7, 2008 — Head of the Sumy Regional State Administration.

May 25 — January 21, 2008 — is a member of the National Security and Defense Council of Ukraine.

March 20, 2008 — April 2, 2010 — Member of the National Council for Interaction between Public Authorities and Local Self-Government Bodies.

June 2008 — Executive Director of the New Energy of Ukraine Alliance.

Since October 2, 2012, Vice President of the Italian Chamber of Commerce and Industry in Ukraine.

References

External links 
 Pavlo Kachur at the Official Ukraine Today portal

1953 births
Living people
People from Ternopil Oblast
People's Movement of Ukraine politicians
Our Ukraine (political party) politicians
Governors of Sumy Oblast
Ministers of Regional Development, Construction and Communal Living of Ukraine
Fourth convocation members of the Verkhovna Rada